Mauro Marconato (born 30 May 1996) is an Argentine footballer who plays for Italian club ASD Ugento as a forward.

References

External links

1996 births
Living people
Footballers from Rosario, Santa Fe
Argentine footballers
Association football forwards
Argentine Primera División players
Primera Nacional players
Torneo Argentino B players
Club Atlético Colón footballers
Sportivo Las Parejas footballers
Club Atlético Patronato footballers
Atlético de Rafaela footballers
Segunda División B players
CF Lorca Deportiva players
Argentine expatriate footballers
Argentine expatriate sportspeople in Spain
Argentine expatriate sportspeople in Italy
Expatriate footballers in Spain
Expatriate footballers in Italy